The Mutiny Memorial, now known as Ajitgarh, is a memorial situated on the Ridge   New Delhi. It was built in memory of all those who had fought in the Delhi Field Force, British and Indian, during the Indian Rebellion of 1857.

History
Erected by the Public Works Department at government expense in 1863 the memorial was hastily designed and constructed. It received much public criticism on completion. In 1972, the 25th anniversary of India's Independence, the Indian Government renamed the monument 'Ajitgarh' ('Place of the Unvanquished') and erected a plaque stating that the 'enemy' mentioned on the memorials were 'immortal martyrs for Indian freedom'.

Architecture

The memorial was built in the Gothic style in red sandstone, with four tiers rising from an octagonal base. The lowest tier consists of seven faces containing memorial plaques and one face holding the stairs to the upper tiers.

Location 
The Mutiny Memorial is located in front of Old Telegraph Building, Kashmiri Gate. you can entre in the memorial by the entrance gate opposite  to Bara Hindu Rao Hospital, near to Delhi University campus in New Delhi.

References

External links

 Heritage walk through Delhi Ridge

British military memorials and cemeteries
Indian military memorials and cemeteries
Indian Rebellion of 1857
Gothic Revival architecture in India
New Delhi
Monuments of National Importance in Delhi
1863 establishments in India